Cell division cycle protein 27 homolog is a protein that in humans is encoded by the CDC27 gene.

Function 

The protein encoded by this gene shares strong similarity with Saccharomyces cerevisiae protein Cdc27, and the gene product of Schizosaccharomyces pombe nuc 2. This protein is a component of anaphase-promoting complex (APC), which is composed of eight protein subunits and highly conserved in eucaryotic cells. APC catalyzes the formation of cyclin B-ubiquitin conjugate that is responsible for the ubiquitin-mediated proteolysis of B-type cyclins. This protein and 3 other members of the APC complex contain the TPR (tetratricopeptide repeat), a protein domain important for protein-protein interaction. This protein was shown to interact with mitotic checkpoint proteins including Mad2, p55CDC and BUBR1, and thus may be involved in controlling the timing of mitosis.

Interactions 

CDC27 has been shown to interact with:

 ANAPC10,
 ANAPC11, 
 ANAPC1, 
 ANAPC4, 
 ANAPC5, 
 ANAPC7, 
 CDC16, 
 CDC20, 
 CDC23, 
 CDH1, 
 FZR1, 
 MAD2L1 and
 PIN1.

References

Further reading

External links